Michael G. Reed (January 6, 1975 – January 31, 2014) was an American football running back who played one season with the Philadelphia Eagles of the National Football League. He played college football at the University of Washington and attended Clover Park High School in Lakewood, Washington. He died of cancer on January 31, 2014, in Bakersfield, California.

References

External links
Just Sports Stats

1975 births
2014 deaths
Players of American football from Washington, D.C.
American football running backs
African-American players of American football
Washington Huskies football players
Philadelphia Eagles players
Deaths from cancer in California
20th-century African-American sportspeople
21st-century African-American sportspeople